Star Theatre(s) or Star Theater(s) may refer to several cinemas or theatres, including:

Australia
 New Star Theatre, Goodwood, Adelaide, later Capri Theatre, often referred to as the Star
 Star Theatre, several cinemas owned by D. Clifford Theatres in Adelaide, South Australia, in the early 20th century 
 Star Theatre, Darwin, Northern Territory, a cinema destroyed by Cyclone Tracy
Star Theatre, Invermay, Tasmania, a former cinema
 Star Theatre, Sydney, within The Star casino, Sydney, New South Wales

United States
 Star Theatres, a movie theatre chain
 Star Theater (Weiser, Idaho), property listed on the National Register of Historic Places in Washington County
 Star Theatre (New York City), originally Wallack's Theatre, demolished in 1901
Star Theatre (film), a short documentary about the construction of the theatre
 Star Theater (Portland, Oregon), silent film and burlesque theater
 Star Theatre (Price, Utah), property listed on the National Register of Historic Places in Carbon County
 Star Theater (Spokane, Washington), concert venue within the Spokane Veterans Memorial Arena in Spokane, Washington
 Star Theatre (Argyle, Wisconsin), listed on the National Register of Historic Places in Lafayette County

Other countries

Star Theatre, Kolkata, India
The Star Performing Arts Centre, Singapore